Balasore railway station serves Balasore, Remuna, Chandipur, Bhograi, Nilagiri, Odisha in Balasore district and other districts like Mayurbhanj, Kendujhargarh and Bhadrak for boarding major trains like Duronto, Rajdhani, Shatabdi, Humsafar Express and many more trains that do not stop at Bhadrak station in the Indian state of Odisha.

Facilities

There are four platforms in Balasore railway station. Generally platforms 1,2 and 3 are used for long-distance trains like express and mail trains and platform no. 4 is used for suburban and local DEMU, MEMU trains.

Balasore railway station has a computerized reservation office, cloak room, waiting room, retiring room, and refreshment room. This station is provided with Railwire free wifi by Google. One can download movies and music at high speed for 30 minutes after which speed will be reduced. Balasore railway station has a double-bedded air-conditioned retiring room, 6 double bedded non-air-conditioned retiring rooms and a six-bedded dormitory, many small shops are available at all the platforms, water vending machine is also available in all platforms.

Passenger movement and train performance
Balasore railway station is an A-grade station. Balasore railway station serves around 130,000 passengers every day. It is a major station in the state of Odisha where all the trains going from Howrah to Chennai make a scheduled stop. Many trains like Bhubaneswar rajdhani express, Bhubneswar-New Delhi duronto express and Howrah–Yashvanantapur Humsafar express, Puri-Howrah shatabdi express halt here. Other trains like Antodaya express and other AC superfast, mail trains have a regular halt in this station. Though this station lacks connectivity to some western states but one can easily get connecting trains from any major station like Bhubaneswar, kharagpur which have frequent connectivity from Balasore railway station. There is a long-standing demand of direct train to Mumbai from Balasore. But the government never paid attention on this demand of locals.

History
During the period 1893 to 1896,   of East Coast State Railway was built and opened to traffic. Bengal Nagpur Railway's line to Cuttack was opened on 1 January 1899.

References

External links
Trains at Balasore

Railway stations in Balasore district
Kharagpur railway division
Railway stations in India opened in 1899
1899 establishments in British India
Transport in Balasore